John Cavanagh may refer to:

John Cavanagh (archer) (born 1956), British Paralympian.
John Cavanagh (designer) (1914–2003), London-based Irish fashion designer
John Cavanagh (economist), Director of the Institute for Policy Studies in Washington DC
John Cavanagh (fives player) (died 1819), Irish sportsman
John Cavanagh (hatter) (1864–1957), New York hatter, mayor of Norwalk, Connecticut

See also
John Kavanagh (disambiguation)
John Cavanaugh (disambiguation)
Jack Kavanagh (disambiguation)